Statistics of Football League First Division in the 1972–73 season.

Overview
Liverpool won the First Division title for the eighth time in the club's history that season. They made sure of the title with a 0–0 draw against Leicester City at Anfield and finished the season three points ahead of title challengers Arsenal. Crystal Palace were relegated on 24 April, after losing 2–1 at relegation rivals Norwich City. West Bromwich Albion joined them the next day after losing 2–1 at home to Manchester City.

League standings

Results

Managerial changes

Team locations

Top scorers

References

RSSSF

Football League First Division seasons
Eng
1972–73 Football League
1972–73 in English football leagues